Belemniastis is a genus of moths in the subfamily Arctiinae. The genus was erected by George Hampson in 1901.

Species
 Belemniastis attidates Druce, 1900
 Belemniastis troetschi Druce, 1896
 Belemniastis whiteleyi Druce, 1888

References

External links

Arctiinae
Moth genera